AP Vojvodina or Autonomous Province of Vojvodina has been the designation of Vojvodina in various sovereign states:

 Autonomous Province of Vojvodina (1945–1968), in FPR Yugoslavia (1945–1963) and SFR Yugoslavia (1963–1968)
 Socialist Autonomous Province of Vojvodina (1968–1990), in SFR Yugoslavia (term used during this period was SAP Vojvodina)
 Autonomous Province of Vojvodina, in SFR Yugoslavia (1990–1992), FR Yugoslavia (1992-2003), Serbia and Montenegro (2003–2006), independent Serbia (since 2006)